is a 1957 color Japanese film directed by Shūe Matsubayashi.

Cast 
 Keiko Awaji
 Takashi Shimura

References 

Japanese romantic drama films
1957 films
Films directed by Shūe Matsubayashi
1950s Japanese films